The 2016 Appalachian State Mountaineers football team represented Appalachian State University in the 2016 NCAA Division I FBS football season. The Mountaineers played their home games at Kidd Brewer Stadium in Boone, North Carolina and competed in the Sun Belt Conference. They were led by fourth-year head coach Scott Satterfield. They finished the season 10–3, 7–1 in Sun Belt play to win a share of the Sun Belt championship with Arkansas State. They were invited to the Camellia Bowl where they defeated Toledo.

Schedule
Appalachian State announced its 2016 football schedule on March 3, 2016. The 2016 schedule consists of 6 home and away games in the regular season. The Mountaineers will host Sun Belt foes Georgia State, Idaho, Louisiana–Monroe, and Texas State, and will travel to Georgia Southern, Louisiana–Lafayette, New Mexico State, and Troy. Appalachian State will skip out on two Sun Belt teams this season, Arkansas State and South Alabama.

The team will play four non–conference games, two home games against Miami from the Atlantic Coast Conference (ACC) and Old Dominion from Conference USA, and two road games against Akron from the Mid-American Conference (MAC) and Tennessee from the Southeastern Conference (SEC).

Schedule Source:

Game summaries

at Tennessee

Old Dominion

Miami (FL)

at Akron

Georgia State

at Louisiana–Lafayette

Idaho

at Georgia Southern

Texas State

at Troy

Louisiana–Monroe

at New Mexico State

Toledo–Camellia Bowl

Roster

References

Appalachian State
Appalachian State Mountaineers football seasons
Sun Belt Conference football champion seasons
Camellia Bowl champion seasons
Appalachian State Mountaineers football